25th Regiment may refer to:

Infantry regiments
 25th Infantry Regiment (Argentina)
 25th Independent Mixed Regiment, a Japanese unit
 25th Infantry Regiment (United States)
 25th Regiment of Foot, a British Army unit
 25th Punjabis, a British Indian Army unit
 25th Continental Regiment, a unit during the American Revolutionary War

Units during the American Civil War 
 25th Arkansas Infantry Regiment, a Confederate Army unit

Union Army 
 25th Connecticut Infantry Regiment
 25th Illinois Infantry Regiment
 25th Indiana Infantry Regiment
 25th Iowa Volunteer Infantry Regiment
 25th Regiment Massachusetts Volunteer Infantry
 25th Regiment Kentucky Volunteer Infantry
 25th Maine Volunteer Infantry Regiment
 25th Michigan Volunteer Infantry Regiment
 25th New Jersey Volunteer Infantry Regiment
 25th New York Volunteer Infantry Regiment
 25th Wisconsin Volunteer Infantry Regiment

Other regiments
 25th Aviation Regiment (United States)
 25th Dragoons, a British Army cavalry unit
 25th Field Artillery Regiment, United States
 25th Greater Poland Uhlan Regiment
 25th SS Police Regiment, Germany

See also
 25th Army (disambiguation)
 25th Brigade (disambiguation)
 XXV Corps (disambiguation)
 25 Squadron (disambiguation)